Telekeyevo (Teläkäy) is a rural locality (a village) in Isanbayevsky Selsoviet, Ilishevsky District, Bashkortostan, Russia. The population was 316 as of 2010. There are 5 streets.

Geography 
Telekeyevo is located 24 km north of Verkhneyarkeyevo (the district's administrative centre) by road. Krasnoyarovo is the nearest rural locality.

References 

Rural localities in Ilishevsky District